State Road 475 (NM 475) is a  state highway in the US state of New Mexico. NM 475's western terminus is at U.S. Route 84 (US 84) and US 285 in Santa Fe, and the eastern terminus is a dead end at Santa Fe Ski Basin.

Major intersections

Gallery

See also

References

475
Transportation in Santa Fe County, New Mexico
Santa Fe, New Mexico